Yampil is an urban-type settlement and railroad station in Lyman urban hromada, Kramatorsk Raion (before in Lyman Raion) of Donetsk Oblast Ukraine. It is located to the southeast of Lyman, lying north of local road T05-13. Population:

History 
On June 19, 2014, Ukrainian forces reportedly secured the settlement from pro-Russian separatists during the war in Donbas. 

On April 28, 2022 the town was occupied by Russia as part of its invasion of Ukraine during the Battle of Donbas. On September 30, the town was liberated by Ukrainian forces.

References

Urban-type settlements in Kramatorsk Raion
Kramatorsk Raion